Crowe Lake is located in Peterborough County, Ontario, Canada. Its total surface area is four square miles. The lake is two miles northwest of Marmora. Its primary inflow is the Crowe River.

Crowe lake contains multiple varieties of fish, including species of walleye, bass, and bluegill. The shore of Crowe Lake is home to Blairton Trailer Park.

References

External links
 Crowe Lake Water Association

Lakes of Peterborough County